Penang State Stadium (Malay: Stadium Negeri Pulau Pinang) is a multi-purpose stadium in Batu Kawan, South Seberang Perai, Penang, Malaysia.  It is currently used mostly for football matches.  The stadium has a capacity of 40,000 people.  It was built in 2000. The stadium has been built to host the 8th Sukma Games (Malaysian Games) in 2000. In 2007, this stadium hosted the Malaysian FA Cup Final. The match was won by Kedah Darul Aman 4–2 in penalties shoot-out.

See also 
 List of stadiums in Malaysia

References 

Football venues in Malaysia
Athletics (track and field) venues in Malaysia
Multi-purpose stadiums in Malaysia
Sports venues in Penang
2000 establishments in Malaysia